Knowsley North and Sefton East was a county constituency represented in the House of Commons of the Parliament of the United Kingdom. It elected one Member of Parliament (MP) by the first past the post system of election.

History
A primarily working-class industrial region, the seat was traditionally one of the strongest Labour-held seats in the country. The original Knowsley North constituency gained several wards from Crosby as a result of boundary changes in 1995. The constituency was represented throughout its existence by George Howarth (Labour), who had held the previous  Knowsley North constituency from 1986.

Boundaries
The Metropolitan Borough of Knowsley wards of Cantril Farm, Cherryfield, Kirkby Central, Knowsley Park, Northwood, Park, Tower Hill, and Whitefield, and the Metropolitan Borough of Sefton wards of Molyneux, Park, and Sudell.

The constituency covered the localities of Kirkby and Knowsley Village in Knowsley; Maghull, Lydiate, Lunt, Sefton Village, Ince Blundell, Waddicar and Melling and Aintree in Sefton.

It was bordered in the south by Knowsley South; in the west by Crosby; in the north by West Lancashire; in the southwest by Liverpool Walton, Liverpool West Derby, and Bootle and in the east by St Helens North and St Helens South.

Following decisions by the Boundary Commission for England, Knowsley North and Sefton East was abolished for the 2010 general election. This seat formed a small part of a new Knowsley seat, with the Crosby, Maghull and Formby elements moving into a new Sefton Central constituency.

Members of Parliament

Elections

Elections in the 1990s

Elections in the 2000s

See also
 List of parliamentary constituencies in Merseyside

Notes and references

Constituencies of the Parliament of the United Kingdom established in 1997
Constituencies of the Parliament of the United Kingdom disestablished in 2010
Politics of the Metropolitan Borough of Knowsley
Politics of the Metropolitan Borough of Sefton
Parliamentary constituencies in North West England (historic)